Theron Newell (July 10, 1916 – August 1, 1993) was an American writer. His work was part of the literature event in the art competition at the 1936 Summer Olympics.

References

1916 births
1993 deaths
20th-century American male writers
Olympic competitors in art competitions
People from Kansas City, Kansas